Konak is a name for a house in Turkey and on the territories of the former Ottoman Empire, especially one used as an official residence.

See also
Konak of Durrës
Princess Ljubica's Residence
Residence of Prince Miloš
Museum of Vuk and Dositej
Agushevi konatsi

References
 Merriam-Webster Unabridged — Konak entry

House types
Architecture in the Ottoman Empire
Architecture in Turkey
Turkish words and phrases